The Packard 1A-1500 was an American 12-cylinder liquid-cooled 60-degree Vee piston aircraft engine designed in 1924. Test flown in the second prototype Douglas XO-2 it proved to be unreliable. Only 29 engines were built.

Applications
 Boeing Model 15
 Boeing XP-4
 Curtiss Falcon
 Douglas XO-2
 Loening OL

Specifications (1A-1500)

See also
 Packard 1A-2500

References

Notes

Bibliography

 Gunston, Bill. World Encyclopedia of Aero Engines. Cambridge, England. Patrick Stephens Limited, 1989. 
Aircraft Engine Historical Society

1920s aircraft piston engines
1A-1500